Pascale Jeuland-Tranchant (née Jeuland; born 2 June 1987) is a French former road and track racing cyclist, who rode professionally between 2007 and 2019 for the ,  and  teams. At the 2010 UCI Track Cycling World Championships, Jeuland won the gold medal in the scratch event. Her older sister is fellow road racing cyclist Nathalie Jeuland. She is married to Guillaume Tranchant.

Major results

Track

2004
 1st  Individual pursuit, National Junior Track Championships
2005
 UEC European Junior Track Championships
2nd Individual pursuit
2nd Points race
3rd Scratch
 National Junior Track Championships
1st  Individual pursuit
1st  Points race
2006
 National Track Championships
2nd Individual pursuit
3rd 500m time trial
2007
 National Track Championships
1st  Points race
3rd Individual pursuit
2008
 1st  Points race, National Track Championships
 2nd Team pursuit, UEC European Under-23 Track Championships (with Audrey Cordon and Elodie Henriette)
2009
 National Track Championships
1st  Points race
1st  Scratch
3rd Individual pursuit
2010
 1st  Scratch, UCI Track Cycling World Championships
 National Track Championships
1st  Points race
3rd Omnium
2011
 National Track Championships
2nd Individual pursuit
2nd Scratch
2012
 2nd Scratch, National Track Championships
2013
 National Track Championships
1st  Individual pursuit
1st  Team pursuit
2014
 National Track Championships
1st  Individual pursuit
1st  Scratch
1st  Team pursuit
2015
 1st  Team pursuit, National Track Championships
 1st Points race, International Belgian Open
 2nd Omnium, Prova Internacional de Anadia
 3rd Omnium, Revolution – Round 1, Derby
 3rd Omnium, Open des Nations sur Piste de Roubaix
2016
 National Track Championships
1st  Omnium
1st  Team pursuit
3rd Individual pursuit
 Fenioux Piste International
1st Points race
1st Scratch
3rd Individual pursuit
 Trofeu CAR Anadia Portugal
1st Points race
1st Individual pursuit
2018
 National Track Championships
1st  Points race
2nd Individual pursuit

Road

2005
 9th Road race, UCI Juniors World Championships
2006
 1st  Road race, National Under-23 Road Championships
2007
 5th Road race, UEC European Under-23 Road Championships
 8th Grand Prix de Dottignies
2008
 9th Overall Tour de Bretagne Féminin
2009
 5th Trophée des Grimpeurs
 6th Road race, UEC European Under-23 Road Championships
 9th Grand Prix de Dottignies
 9th Rund um die Nürnberger Altstadt
 10th GP Stad Roeselare
2010
 10th GP Ciudad de Valladolid
2011
 6th Omloop van het Hageland
 6th Ronde van Gelderland
2012
 2nd Cholet Pays de Loire Dames
 6th Drentse 8 van Dwingeloo
2013
 7th Cholet Pays de Loire Dames
2014
 1st Stage 5 Trophée d'Or Féminin
2015
 2nd La Classique Morbihan
 3rd Grand Prix de Dottignies
 5th Cholet Pays de Loire Dames
 6th Overall Tour of Chongming Island
 7th Tour of Chongming Island World Cup
 8th Overall Ladies Tour of Qatar
 9th Overall The Women's Tour
2016
 4th SwissEver GP Cham-Hagendorn
 6th La Course by Le Tour de France
2018
 3rd Grand Prix de Dottignies
 3rd Grand Prix International d'Isbergues
 4th Trofee Maarten Wynants
 5th Omloop van Borsele
 7th Kreiz Breizh Elites Dames
 9th Diamond Tour
2019
 3rd Grand Prix International d'Isbergues
 7th Flanders Ladies Classic
 10th Overall Tour of Chongming Island

References

External links
 
 
 
 
 
 
 

1987 births
Living people
French female cyclists
French track cyclists
Olympic cyclists of France
Cyclists at the 2008 Summer Olympics
European Games competitors for France
Cyclists at the 2019 European Games
UCI Track Cycling World Champions (women)
Cyclists from Rennes
20th-century French women
21st-century French women